The 2009–10 season was be ES Sétif's 40th season in the Algerian top flight, newly renamed to the Algerian Ligue Professionnelle 1, as well as the 2010 CAF Champions League and the Algerian Cup.

Squad list
Players and squad numbers last updated on 6 August 2009.Note: Flags indicate national team as has been defined under FIFA eligibility rules. Players may hold more than one non-FIFA nationality.

Competitions

Overview

{| class="wikitable" style="text-align: center"
|-
!rowspan=2|Competition
!colspan=8|Record
!rowspan=2|Started round
!rowspan=2|Final position / round
!rowspan=2|First match	
!rowspan=2|Last match
|-
!
!
!
!
!
!
!
!
|-
| National

|  
| style="background:silver;"|Runners-up
| 6 August 2009
| 31 May 2010
|-
| Algerian Cup

| Round of 64 
| style="background:gold;"|Winner
| 25 December 2009
| 1 May 2010
|-
| Confederation Cup

| Group stage
| style="background:silver;"|Runners-up
| 19 July 2009
| 5 December 2009
|-
| Champions League

| Preliminary Round
| Second round
| 14 February 2010
| 8 May 2010
|-
! Total

National

League table

Results summary

Results by round

Matches

Algerian Cup

Confederation Cup

Group stage

Group A

Semi-finals

Final

Champions League

Preliminary round

First round

Second round

Squad information

Playing statistics

|-
! colspan=14 style=background:#dcdcdc; text-align:center| Goalkeepers

|-
! colspan=14 style=background:#dcdcdc; text-align:center| Defenders

|-
! colspan=14 style=background:#dcdcdc; text-align:center| Midfielders

|-
! colspan=14 style=background:#dcdcdc; text-align:center| Forwards

|-
! colspan=14 style=background:#dcdcdc; text-align:center| Players transferred out during the season

Goalscorers
Includes all competitive matches. The list is sorted alphabetically by surname when total goals are equal.

Transfers

In

Out

References

ES Sétif seasons
ES Setif